Line SFM1 is part of the Turin Metropolitan Railway Service. It links Pont Canavese to Chieri, and passes through the city centre.

Following a 15% increase in ridership since the route was launched in 2012, three four-car Alstom Coradia Meridian EMU trains entered service on route SFM1 in January 2014.

References

Turin Metropolitan Railway Service